Sundblom is a surname. Notable people with the surname include:

Haddon Sundblom (1899–1976), American artist
Julius Sundblom (1865–1945), Finnish editor and politician

See also
Sandblom

Finnish-language surnames